Alvin Adolf Holmes (October 26, 1939 – November 21, 2020) was an American politician who served as a member of the Alabama House of Representatives from the 78th District from 1974 to 2018. He was a member of the Democratic party.

Alvin Holmes was an Alabama Delegate to the 1968 Democratic National Convention and again to the 1996 Democratic National Convention.

Holmes died on November 21, 2020, at the age of 81.

References

1939 births
2020 deaths
Democratic Party members of the Alabama House of Representatives
African-American state legislators in Alabama
Politicians from Montgomery, Alabama
21st-century American politicians
Alabama State University alumni
Faulkner University alumni
21st-century African-American politicians
20th-century African-American people